H. Emerson Blake (also credited as Emerson Blake, or Chip Blake) is an ecologist, writer, and editor of many books. He was formerly the editor-in-chief at Orion Magazine, executive director of the Orion Society, and editor-in-chief at Milkweed Editions.

Biography
Blake is originally from Philadelphia. He received his bachelor's degree from the University of Colorado at Boulder and finished his graduate work at Antioch University New England. While at Antioch, he helped found Whole Terrain, an environmentally-themed literary journal, and edited the first volume, Environmental Identity and Professional Choices (1992).

Though he studied ecology, Blake has been ensconced in the world of small publishing, editing, and nature writing. He was hired in 1992 at Orion Magazine as associate editor and continued as managing editor until 2003. When Milkweed Editions co-founder Emilie Buchwald retired in 2003, Blake took over as editor-in-chief of the small publishing company. In June 2005, Blake returned to take his current post as editor-in-chief of Orion Magazine and executive director of the Orion Society, moving on from Milkweed for personal reasons.

Books and essays he has edited have been nominated and won many awards including the National Magazine Award, the Pushcart Prize, the PEN Literary Award, the John Oakes Award in Environmental Journalism, the Minnesota Book Award, the Oregon Book Award, and The New York Times Notable Book of the Year. He has served as a judge for the Phil Reed Writing Award alongside Nikki Giovanni, Janisse Ray, Bill McKibben, Wilma Dykeman, and Jan DeBlieu.

He has served as a visiting faculty member at Sterling College in Craftsbury, Vermont.

Blake resides in Great Barrington, Massachusetts.

References
 Milkweed Lures Harcourt Editor by Claire Kirch, Publishers Weekly, September 16, 2005
 Minnesota: land of long-lasting small presses by Marianne Combs, Minnesota Public Radio October 8, 2004
 New Leaders for Literary Nonprofits by Kevin Larimer at Poets&Writers, Inc.
Orion Magazine Staff
 Orion Society Staff
 Phil Reed Writing Award, Southern Environmental Law Center
 Practise What You Preach, Magazine PAPER Project, Down To Earth Magazine
 Sterling College Faculty

External links
 Welcome to Whole Terrain by H. Emerson Blake, published in Whole Terrain, Volume 1
 Whole Terrain link to Blake articles published in Whole Terrain

Year of birth missing (living people)
Living people
American environmentalists
American non-fiction environmental writers
American naturalists
Antioch University New England alumni
University of Colorado alumni
Writers from Philadelphia